= Erik Wistrand =

Swedish classical philologist

Erik Karl Hilding Wistrand (1907 – 2 October 1998) was a Swedish Latin writer. He wrote 18 total books.

== Bibliography ==
- Politik och litteratur i antikens Rom - (1978)
- Arv och testamenten i romarnas sociala liv - (1966)
- Caesar and contemporary Roman society (1976)
- De Martialis Epigr. 8 15 commentati-uncula scripsit Erik Wistrand - (1955)
- Der instrumentalis als kasus der anschauung im lateinischen - (1941)
